Nirarathamnos asarifolius is a species of flowering plant in the family Apiaceae, and the only species in the genus Nirarathamnos. It is endemic to Yemen. Its natural habitat is rocky areas. It is listed as a vulnerable species on the IUCN Red List.

References

Apioideae
Endemic flora of Socotra
Vulnerable plants
Taxonomy articles created by Polbot
Taxa named by Isaac Bayley Balfour
Monotypic Apioideae genera